Alfons Masella is a Tongan rugby league footballer who represented Tonga in the 2000 World Cup.

Playing career
While playing lower grades for St George Illawarra, Masella was selected for Tonga in the 2000 World Cup. He also represented Tonga in 1999, in a Test match against the New Zealand national rugby league team.

References

Living people
Tongan rugby league players
Tonga national rugby league team players
Rugby league props
Rugby league second-rows
Year of birth missing (living people)